Garhwal District is a former district in Kumaon of British India of the United Provinces, and had an area of . It later became a part of the Indian state of Uttar Pradesh, today it is part of the Indian state Uttarakhand.

History
The first dynasty that ruled over Uttarakhand was Katyuri. It marked various milestones in the area of inscriptions and temples. After the downfall of Katyuris the whole of Garhwal region was broken up into more than sixty four principalities which were ruled by a chieftain. Originally Garhwal had 52  (fortresses). These  were small and had their own chiefs who were responsible for the welfare of the fort. The Garhwal Kingdom was found by one of the chief named Ajay Pal, who reduced the petty forts and brought them under his own chieftainship. He and his ancestors ruled over Garhwal and Tehri till 1803. During their rule they encountered various attacks from "Mughals", "Sikhs", "Rohillas" and "Gorkhas". The Garhwalis started associating the term "Gorkhyani" with massacre. Despite the efforts of the Garhwalis the Gorkhas managed to capture till Langoorgarh but had to retreat due to an attack by the Chinese army.  In 1803 the Gurkhas invaded Kumaon and Garhwal yet again and drove the Garhwal chief away. For the next 12 years the Gurkhas ruled over Garhwal. In 1814 they got into a war with the British for encroaching on their territory. Garhwal and Kumaon then became a British district. Garhwal had an area of 5629 sq. mil and was under the Kumaon division. After independence garhwal, Almora and Nainital were administered by the commissioner of Kumaon division. In 1960 Chamoli was removed out of the Garhwal region. In 1969 Garhwal division was established and Pauri was made its headquarters.

People
The people of Garhwal are known as Garhwalis. Very often they are called Pahari, meaning People from the mountains. Almost 99% of the Garhwalis are Hindus. Today they have migrated from the mountains to all over the world. People of almost all ethnicities can be found in the Garhwal region.  Following are some of them:

Rajputs:: The Rajputs has been derived from the Sanskrit tatpurusha " Rajaputra" meaning "son of the King". They belong to the Indian Subcontinent and are also found in the northern region of Garhwal. They are believed to be of Aryan origin. The Rajputs came from the Hindu Kush through Kashmir and settled in parts of Himachal Pradesh and some areas of the South. They later migrated from there to Garhwal. Later they fled from the plains to the mountains when the Mughals invaded Rajasthan. They settled in the mountains and brought new skills and techniques along with them and practiced agriculture for a lot of time. Later they started joining other professions also. The Rajputs have also been a part of the Garhwal army. Today Garhwali Rajputs can be found all over the world.
Brahmins: The Brahmins settled in the Garhwal region are considered to be the descendants of the priests who migrated from the plains and settled in Garhwal. The Garhwali Brahmins are also believed to have fled from various regions to flee from the Mughal invasion. They penetrated through valleys into Garhwal and found many areas named similarly to those from where they had migrated.
Tribals: The Tribals of Garhwal are of Mongoloid origin and have settled in the upper tracts of Garhwal. They lead a nomadic or semi nomadic way of life and are involved in occupations like animal husbandry, trade etc. Following are some of the tribes of Garhwal: A. Jaunsaris of Jaunsar-Bawar

References

Districts of British India
Historical Indian regions
History of Uttarakhand
Pauri Garhwal district
Tehri Garhwal district